Spiro(s) may refer to:

 Spiro, Oklahoma, a town in the U.S.
 Spiro Mounds, an archaeological site
 Spiro (band), a British music group
 Spiro (name), including a list of people with the name
 Špiro, South Slavic masculine given name
 ARA Spiro, two ships of the Argentine Navy 
 , an oil tanker 
 Euler spiral, or spiro, a curve
 Spiro compound, a type of chemical structure 
 Spironolactone, a medicine, often used in feminizing hormone therapy

See also 
 
 
 Spiro compound, a class of organic compound featuring two rings joined at one atom
 Spirou (comics), a Belgian comic strip character
 Spyro
 Spira (disambiguation)